Memory forensics is forensic analysis of a computer's memory dump.  Its primary application is investigation of advanced computer attacks which are stealthy enough to avoid leaving data on the computer's hard drive.  Consequently, the memory (RAM) must be analyzed for forensic information.

History

Zeroth generation tools
Prior to 2004, memory forensics was done on an ad hoc basis, using generic data analysis tools like strings and grep.  These tools are not specifically created for memory forensics, and therefore are difficult to use.  They also provide limited information.  In general, their primary usage is to extract text from the memory dump.

Many operating systems provide features to kernel developers and end-users to actually create a snapshot of the physical memory for either debugging (core dump or Blue Screen of Death) purposes or experience enhancement (Hibernation (computing)). In the case of Microsoft Windows, crash dumps and hibernation had been present since Microsoft Windows NT. Microsoft crash dumps had always been analyzable by Microsoft WinDbg, and Windows hibernation files (hiberfil.sys) are nowadays convertible in Microsoft crash dumps using utilities like MoonSols Windows Memory Toolkit designed by Matthieu Suiche.

First generation tools
In February 2004, Michael Ford introduced memory forensics into security investigations with an article in SysAdmin Magazine.  In that article, he demonstrated analysis of a memory based rootkit.  The process utilized the existing Linux crash utility as well as two tools developed specifically to recover and analyze the memory forensically, memget and mempeek.

In 2005, DFRWS issued a Memory Analysis Forensics Challenge.  In response to this challenge, more tools in this generation, specifically designed to analyze memory dumps, were created.  These tools had knowledge of the operating system's internal data structures, and were thus capable of reconstructing the operating system's process list and process information.

Although intended as research tools, they proved that operating system level memory forensics is possible and practical.

Second generation tools
Subsequently, several memory forensics tools were developed intended for practical use.  These include both commercial tools like Responder PRO, Memoryze, MoonSols Windows Memory Toolkit, winen, Belkasoft Live RAM Capturer, etc.; open source tools like Volatility. New features have been added, such as analysis of Linux and Mac OS X memory dumps, and substantial academic research has been carried out.

Unlike Microsoft Windows, Mac OS X interest is relatively new and had only been initiated by Matthieu Suiche in 2010 during Black Hat Briefings security conference.

Currently, memory forensics is a standard component of incident response.

Third generation tools
Since 2010, we started to see more utilities focusing on the visualization aspect of memory analysis such as MoonSols LiveCloudKd presented by Matthieu Suiche at Microsoft BlueHat Security Briefings that inspired a new feature in Microsoft LiveKd written by Mark Russinovich to allow virtual machines introspection by accessing the memory of guest virtual machine from the host virtual machine in order to either analyze them directly with the assistance of Microsoft WinDbg or to acquire a memory dump in a Microsoft crash dump file format.

References

Computer forensics